John Scarborough (April 21, 1831 – March 14, 1914) was bishop of the Episcopal Diocese of New Jersey from 1875 to 1914.

Biography
Scarborough was born on April 21, 1831, in Castlewellan County Down in Ireland. He and his family emigrated to the United States when he was a child and received his early education at Queensbury, New York. he graduated from Trinity College in Hartford in 1854 after which he attended the General Theological Seminary in New York. He was ordained deacon in Trinity Church on June 28, 1857, by Bishop Horatio Potter. He became assistant in St Paul Church in Troy, New York where he was ordained priest on August 14, 1858. In 1861 he became rector of the Church of the Holy Comforter in Poughkeepsie, New York and in 1867 was made rector of Trinity Church in Pittsburgh. He was consecrated as Bishop of New Jersey at St. Mary's Church, Burlington, on February 2, 1875. He died of pleuro-pneumonia on March 14, 1914.

References

1831 births
1914 deaths
Northern Ireland emigrants to the United States
People from County Down
People from Queensbury, New York
Trinity College (Connecticut) alumni
General Theological Seminary alumni
19th-century American Episcopalians
Episcopal bishops of New Jersey